United Nations Security Council Resolution 1705, adopted unanimously on August 29, 2006, after noting a letter from the President of the Security Council, the Council extended the term of Judge Solomy Balungi Bossa at the International Criminal Tribunal for Rwanda (ICTR).

The extension permitted Judge Bossa to complete the Butare case, beyond the expiry of her term of office on June 24, 2007.

See also
 List of United Nations Security Council Resolutions 1701 to 1800 (2006–2008)
 Rwandan genocide

References

External links
 
Text of the Resolution at undocs.org

 1705
2006 in Rwanda
 1705
August 2006 events